(sometimes known as the World's Strongest Fisherman) is a commercial fisherman, captain, and musician. He is regularly seen on the Japanese television show Sasuke (Ninja Warrior) where he was one of the "SASUKE All-Stars," a group of favored competitors who were thought to possess the greatest potential in completing the obstacle courses. He can also be seen on the lesser known spinoff to Ninja Warrior, Viking: The Ultimate Obstacle Course, where he was one of few competitors to make it to the final round.

Winning in the 17th Sasuke competition (2006) he is the second of only four victors of the competition. By the time he retired in July 2017, he had competed in 26 versions of Sasuke,  and has since competed in a 27th version in 2020.

Sasuke career

Training
Nagano spent 300 days a year training on his fishing ship for the Sasuke competitions.

Retirement
Leading up to the 32nd competition in 2016, Nagano formally announced his retirement from Sasuke, with his "last run" making up a significant portion of the broadcast and promotional material for the tournament. This involved several gifts from fans and fellow competitors alike, including a "finish" button normally found at the end of the courses. Additionally, a special retirement ceremony was held following his run, concluding with his friends and fellow competitors throwing him into a water pit, mirroring his total victory celebrations in Sasuke 17.

By the time he retired in July 2017, he had competed in 26 versions of Sasuke. As of 2020, he holds the record for reaching the final stage a total of five times.

After retirement, Nagano became a consultant and analyst for the program, appearing on the sidelines in every tournament since. In late 2020, it was announced that he was coming out of retirement to compete in the 38th tournament, his first Sasuke competition in four years.

U.S. appearance

In September 2008 Nagano made his first United States appearance at the Chibi-Pa Festival in West Palm Beach, Florida.

Music career
Nagano released his first album, Yujou To Tatakaino Kiseki, in 2011.

Sasuke appearances
This list shows all the competitions Nagano participated in, along with his contestant number, and the stage and obstacle where he was eliminated.

† - Nagano failed on the First Stage due to a malfunction on the Slider Jump. Since this was the fault of the course and not Nagano, he was given a second attempt at the First Stage, which would be the first time in Sasuke history that someone had  been given a second chance after failing in the same competition. In his second attempt he would complete the First Stage and end up getting all the way to the Final Stage.

* In the 10th Competition, the contestant numbers ranged from 901 to 1000 to show that 1000 competitors have attempted Sasuke. Thus, rather than 99, Nagano's contestant number was 999. Similarly, in the 20th Competition, the numbers ran from 1901 to 2000 to indicate that 2000 competitors have attempted Sasuke First Stage. Nagano's number was 2000 here rather than 100. Then, in the 30th Competition, the numbers went from 2901 to 3000 to indicate that 3000 competitors have attempted Sasuke First Stage, and Nagano's number was 2999 rather than 99. In the 40th competition, the contestant numbers ranged from 3901 to 4000 to make clear that there had now been 4000 competitors that have attempted Sasukes First stage. Nagano was therefore awarded the number 3998 to compete with instead of 98.
** When Nagano tried to cross the second gap in the redesigned Cliff Hanger, he accidentally grabbed the top frame with his left hand. Rather than continue on with the 3rd Stage, he announced his mistake, gracefully disqualifying himself from the competition.

See also
Sasuke
Kinniku Banzuke

References

External links
 Makoto Nagano Official Page (Japanese)'

1972 births
Contestants on Japanese game shows
Fishers
Living people
Sasuke (TV series) contestants